Dilman Kinsey Erb (July 16, 1857 – February 19, 1936) was an educator, farmer, and politician in Ontario, Canada. He represented Perth South in the House of Commons of Canada from 1896 to 1904 as a Liberal member.

He was born in Woolwich Township, Canada West, the son of Isaac Erb and Hannah Kinsey. His family was of Swiss descent and came to Waterloo County by way of Pennsylvania. Erb was educated in Bridgeport, Ontario, taught school for several years and was principal of the New Dundee public school. In 1881, he married Phoebe Huber. Four years later, he moved to Downie Township, where he became a farmer. Erb was a member of the school board and township council for Downie Township, also serving as deputy reeve.  Around 1892, he was named a justice of the peace. Erb served four years as president of the Sebringville Flax Company. He died in Downie Township at the age of 78.

He was a distant relative of Abraham Erb, an early settler of Waterloo Township and the founder of Waterloo, Ontario.

References

External links
 Dilman Erb biography

1857 births
1936 deaths
Members of the House of Commons of Canada from Ontario
Liberal Party of Canada MPs
People from Woolwich, Ontario
Canadian justices of the peace
Canadian people of Swiss descent